Keelty is a surname. Notable people with the surname include:

James Keelty (1911–2003), American real estate developer and baseball team owner
Mick Keelty (born 1954), Australian police officer

See also
Keely